Luzhou District, formerly known as Chengqu or Cheng District is a district of Changzhi, Shanxi, China.

Changzhi East railway station is located here.

References

External links
Official website of Luzhou District government

County-level divisions of Shanxi
Changzhi